Feyzabad-e Kohneh (also Romanized as Feyẕābād-e Kohneh and Feyzābād-e Kohneh; also known as Faizābād, Feyẕābād, Feyzābād, and Feyẕābād-e Soflá) is a village in Tirjerd Rural District, in the Central District of Abarkuh County, Yazd Province, Iran. At the 2006 census, its population was 255, in 68 families.

References 

Populated places in Abarkuh County